John Hickton (born 24 September 1944) is an English former professional footballer who played in the Football League as a striker for Sheffield Wednesday, Middlesbrough and Hull City, and in the North American Soccer League for Fort Lauderdale Strikers. He is noted for his prolific scoring for Middlesbrough between 1966 and 1976.

Hickton was born in Brimington, near Chesterfield in Derbyshire. He started his career at Sheffield Wednesday, and made his debut in the Football League First Division on 7 March 1964 in a 2–2 draw away to Aston Villa. He went on to score 21 goals from 56 appearances, which caught the eye of Middlesbrough manager Stan Anderson, who took Hickton to Teesside in 1966.

Hickton was a goalscoring legend at Middlesbrough where he scored 192 goals in 10 years at the club, making nearly 500 appearances. As of 2009, he ranked fourth in the club's all-time goalscorers list and third in terms of appearances, behind George Camsell, George Elliott and Brian Clough, and Tim Williamson and Gordon Jones respectively.

References

External links
 League stats at Neil Brown's site
 Stats and photo at Sporting Heroes

1944 births
Living people
Footballers from Chesterfield
English footballers
Association football forwards
Sheffield Wednesday F.C. players
Middlesbrough F.C. players
Hull City A.F.C. players
Fort Lauderdale Strikers (1977–1983) players
Whitby Town F.C. players
English Football League players
North American Soccer League (1968–1984) players
English expatriate sportspeople in the United States
Expatriate soccer players in the United States
English expatriate footballers